Mulga Gaari, New South Wales  is a remote rural locality of Darling Shire, and a cadastral parish of Tandora County, Australia. Mulga Gaari is located at 31°57'37.0"S 142°41'32.0"E on the Barrier Highway west of Wilcannia The parish is bounded to the south by the Menindee Lakes.

References

Localities in New South Wales